Aloeides angolensis is a butterfly in the family Lycaenidae. It is found in Angola.

References

Butterflies described in 1973
Aloeides
Endemic fauna of Angola
Butterflies of Africa